High Four is a bronze public sculpture by artist Louise Peterson.  It depicts a Great Dane dog, raising one paw as if to shake hands or give a high five.

Information

Location history
There are ten editions of the sculpture, which are in several public collections, including Benson Sculpture Park in Loveland Colorado.  One copy was installed at Canine Corner, a dog park in Cleveland, Colorado, in 2007.  It was later relocated to Conestee Dog Park.  Other copies are in Northglenn, Colorado, Greenville, South Carolina, and Chattanooga, Tennessee (2008.

Artist
 Peterson was born in England in 1962.  She moved to the United States in 1984 and studied sculpture at Santa Monica College in Santa Monica, California.  She currently lives on a ranch near Guffey, Colorado.  She specializes in animal sculpture, especially Great Danes.

See also
 Public Art
 Sculpture

References

Bronze sculptures in the United States
Sculptures of dogs in the United States